"Groupie Love" is a song by American singer and songwriter Lana Del Rey featuring American rapper ASAP Rocky featured on her fifth studio album Lust for Life. The song was released for digital download on July 12, 2017, alongside "Summer Bummer", another collaboration between the two alongside Playboi Carti, as a promotional single with the pre-order of the album. The song was later sent to Italian radio on July 28, 2017 as the album's fourth single. The song was written by the artists and Rick Nowels, who produced it with Del Rey, Emile Haynie, Kieron Menzies, Hector Delgado, and Dean Reid.

Critical reception
"Groupie Love" received mixed reviews from critics. Dan Weiss of Consequence of Sound criticized ASAP Rocky's contribution, saying that it "adds nothing" to the track. Ana Gaca of Spin said that "'Groupie Love' relegates Rocky to a pop song's standard third verse rap feature, where any supposed romantic chemistry falls flat. Del Rey's choruses are almost lush enough to sell a vision of vintage backstage hedonism, but she winds up tripping over the clichés she idolizes. The very first lines—"You're in the bar / Playing guitar"—should have been struck as soon as they were written."

Matt F of HotNewHipHop said that "Groupie Love" "captures a similar, gently warped vibe that her previous music has fostered over the years". Alexa Camp of Slant Magazine said that compared with "Summer Bummer", "Groupie Love" is more a retro-minded pop song featuring Del Rey's signature sonorous, reverb-coated vocals.

Odette Yiu of juice.com.sg described the song as a "soul-folk-trap melange that gets her point across. And from it all beams an effusive self-confidence and surety that is new to her oeuvre. "It's so sweet, / Swingin' to the beat / When I know that you're doing it / All for me," she croons, her voice sultry and seductive, the tone both transfixed and transfixing, and almost tauntingly knowing." Yiu also said that Rocky "plays so much more than second fiddle. He's the match to Lana's gushing oil wells and child-lipped, rose-eyed, ceaseless caresses of affection: The "You and I 'til the day we die" to her "It's like magic, babe, isn't life wonderful?" Gone are the dreary days of her Born to Die sadness.

Track listing

Credits
Credits adapted from Tidal.

Management
Published by Sony/ATV Music Publishing (ASCAP)
Published by A$AP Rocky Music Publishing LLC/Sony/ATV Songs LLC (BMI)
Published by R-Rated Music administered by EMI April Music Inc (Global Music Rights)
A$AP Rocky appears courtesy of A$AP Worldwide/Polo Grounds Music/RCA Records

Personnel
Lana Del Rey – vocals, songwriting, production
ASAP Rocky – vocals, songwriting
Rick Nowels – songwriting, production, Mellotron, piano, synthesizer, synthesizer program, vibraphone
Hector Delgado – production, engineering, keyboard, bass guitar, drums, percussion, synthesizer
Kieron Menzies – production, engineering, keyboard, drums, mixing, percussion, synthesizer
Dean Reid – production, engineering, bass guitar, vocoder, mixing, sound effects
Trevor Yasuda – engineering, keyboards
Patrick Warren – keyboards, piano, strings
Zac Rae – keyboards, electric guitar
David Levita – electric guitar
Berkay Birecikli – percussion
Mighty Mike – sound effects

Charts

Release history

References

2017 songs
Songs about groupies
Lana Del Rey songs
ASAP Rocky songs
Song recordings produced by Emile Haynie
Song recordings produced by Rick Nowels
Songs written by ASAP Rocky
Songs written by Lana Del Rey
Songs written by Rick Nowels
Polydor Records singles
Interscope Records singles
American soul songs
American folk songs
Song recordings produced by Lana Del Rey